The men's individual compound archery competition at the 2014 Asian Games in Incheon was held from 23 to 27 September at Gyeyang Asiad Archery Field.

A total of 55 archers participated in the qualification round after one pulled out. Only the top two archers from each country were allowed to progress to the knockout stage.

Schedule
All times are Korea Standard Time (UTC+09:00)

Results 
Legend
DNS — Did not start

Ranking round

Knockout round

Finals

Section 1

Section 2

Section 3

Section 4

References

External links
Official website

Men's compound individual